Sibsagar Girls' College, established in 1964, is a women's general degree college situated in Sibsagar, Assam. This college is affiliated with the Dibrugarh University. This college offers bachelor's degree courses in arts and science.

References

External links

Women's universities and colleges in Assam
Colleges affiliated to Dibrugarh University
Educational institutions established in 1964
1964 establishments in Assam
Sivasagar